SS Princess Adelaide was a passenger vessel in the coastal service fleet of the Canadian Pacific Railway (CPR) during the first half of the 20th century.

This ship was called a "pocket liner" because she  offered amenities like a great ocean liner, but on a smaller scale. The ship was part of the CPR "Princess fleet,"  which was composed of ships having names which began with the title "Princess".

History
SS Princess Adelaide was built by Fairfield Shipbuilding and Engineering Company, Govan, Scotland for the Canadian Pacific Railway.

SS Princess Adelaide was added to the active roster of the CPR fleet in 1910.

In 1949, the ship was sold to a Greek firm (Typaldos Lines) and renamed SS Angelika. She was scrapped in 1967.

See also
 CP Ships
 List of ocean liners
 List of ships in British Columbia

Notes

References 
 Musk, George. (1981).  Canadian Pacific: The Story of the Famous Shipping Line.  Newton Abbot, Devon: David & Charles. ;  OCLC 7523720

1910 ships
Ocean liners
Steamships of Canada
Ships of CP Ships
Ships built in Govan